The 2003 Southeastern Conference baseball tournament was held at Hoover Metropolitan Stadium in Hoover, AL from May 21 through 25.  Alabama won the tournament and earned the Southeastern Conference's automatic bid to the 2003 NCAA Tournament.

Regular Season Results

Tournament

 * indicates extra innings.
 ~ Game was shortened by 10-run rule.
Florida, Tennessee, Georgia and Kentucky did not make the tournament.
The first day of the tournament was postponed by rain after the completion of the Vanderbilt-Auburn first-round game.

All-Tournament Team

See also
College World Series
NCAA Division I Baseball Championship
Southeastern Conference baseball tournament

References

SECSports.com All-Time Baseball Tournament Results
Boydsworld 2003 Standings
SECSports.com All-Tourney Team Lists

Tournament
Southeastern Conference Baseball Tournament
Southeastern Conference baseball tournament
Southeastern Conference baseball tournament
College sports tournaments in Alabama
Baseball competitions in Hoover, Alabama